Captain Alexander V. Fraser, U. S. Revenue Marine, (April 20, 1804 – 1868) was an American seaman, who served as the first Chief of the Revenue Marine Bureau, Department of the Treasury, one of the predecessor agencies of the United States Coast Guard.

Biography

Early life and career
Fraser was born in New York City to a family of Scottish descent. After attending the Mathematical, Nautical and Commercial School in New York, he began his sea-faring career in the merchant service, in the East India trade. Fraser was a master mariner when he joined the Revenue Marine in 1832, and was appointed second lieutenant of the cutter , commanded by W. A. Hammond. Stationed at Charleston during the Nullification Crisis, Fraser's duty was to board ships bringing sugar from Cuba and collect import taxes. In 1836 he took leave of absence to command the merchant ship Himmaleh on a voyage to Japan, China and the Malay Archipelago.

After two years he returned to the Revenue Marine and was appointed first lieutenant of Alert. By now Congress had passed a law (dated December 22, 1837) ordering the Revenue Marine to render assistance to vessels in distress. In 1842 Fraser was appointed captain of the new cutter .

Chief of the Revenue Marine Bureau
On November 1, 1843 Secretary of the Treasury John C. Spencer created the Revenue Marine Bureau to institute centralized control of the Revenue Marine. (Previously cutters were controlled by the Collector of Customs at the port to which it was assigned.) Fraser was appointed the Bureau's first Chief. From his office at the Treasury Fraser was in charge of all financial, material and personnel matters concerning the service, with a single lieutenant to assist him. He promptly introduced a new system of promotion based on examination, and an increase in pay for non-commissioned and enlisted men. He also prohibited the use of slave labor, and the drinking of alcohol aboard revenue cutters. He also supported the building of iron-hulled steam vessels rather than wooden-hulled sailing ships.

In his first report of January 9, 1844 Fraser stated:

In fact the Revenue Marine had first requested the introduction of steam vessels in 1837, and had finally placed contracts for six steam cutters in 1840. This experiment proved to be a failure as the ships proved to be expensive to build and maintain, slow, leaky and fuel-inefficient, and by 1852 all but three had been disposed of or transferred to the United States Coast Survey.

Fraser also made regular inspection tours to lighthouses and other aids to navigation, as well as the lifesaving stations. He also attempted to have the Revenue Marine merged with the Life-Saving Service and the Lighthouse Board. (The Revenue Cutter Service was eventually merged with the Life-Saving Service on January 28, 1915, to form the United States Coast Guard.)

Later career
Fraser was eventually replaced as Chief of the Bureau by Captain Richard Evans on November 15, 1848. He then took command of the Revenue Marine cutter  for a voyage around the Cape of Good Hope to San Francisco, California to enforce the revenue laws there. Despite many members of his crew deserting to take part in the Gold Rush, Fraser continued to carry out his duties of aiding distressed ships, collecting revenue, and surveying the ports and coast of California, until finally returning to New York in 1852.

In 1856 Fraser successfully lobbied for the building of a new steam-powered cutter, at New York, despite the previous failures. However this brought him into conflict with the Assistant Secretary of the Navy, who opposed the project, and he was removed from the service. He then became a marine insurance agent in New York.

Fraser attempted to rejoin the Revenue Marine during the Civil War as President Lincoln signed a commission reinstating Fraser as Captain, however he was unable to serve.  He died in Brooklyn in 1868.

See also

 Commandant of the Coast Guard
 Californian, a replica of the USRC C. W. Lawrence

Notes
Footnotes

Citations

References used

 
 

1804 births
1868 deaths
American people of Scottish descent
Military personnel from New York City
United States Revenue Cutter Service officers